Matar al padre is a four-part Spanish family drama television miniseries with comedy elements directed by Mar Coll. It stars Gonzalo de Castro, Paulina García, Marcel Borràs, Greta Fernández, Pol López and Nuria González. It was released by Movistar+ in May 2018.

Premises 
The fiction spans along 16 years, with each episode respectively set in 1996, 2004, 2008 and 2012. Starting in 1996 post-Olympic Barcelona, the plot focuses on Jacobo Vidal—an authoritarian, obsessive and dysfunctional pater familias—and his developing relationship with his children, Tomás and Valeria. While the depicted family members in the series are largely Spanish-speaking, they sometimes interact with other characters in Catalan too.

Cast 
 Gonzalo de Castro as Jacobo Vidal.
 Paulina García as Isabel.
  as Tomás.
 Greta Fernández as Valeria.
 Pol López as Iván.
 Nuria González as Mireia.

Production and release 
Entirely shot in Catalonia, production crew worked in the surroundings of Barcelona, namely in Font Vella de . Matar al padre was pre-screened on 18 April 2018 at the 21st Málaga Spanish Film Festival. Consisting of 4 episodes with a running time of around 50 minutes, the miniseries was fully released by Movistar+ on 25 May 2018.

References 

Television series set in 1996
Television series set in 2004
Television series set in 2008
Television series set in 2012
Television shows set in Barcelona
Spanish television miniseries
2018 Spanish television series debuts
2018 Spanish television series endings
Movistar+ network series
Television shows filmed in Spain
2010s Spanish drama television series
2010s Spanish comedy television series
Spanish-language television shows